Torrazza Piemonte is a comune (municipality) in the Metropolitan City of Turin in the Italian region Piedmont, about  northeast of Turin.

External links
Unofficial website of Torrazza Piemonte and Borgoregio

References

Cities and towns in Piedmont